Visa requirements for Georgian citizens are administrative entry restrictions by the authorities of other states placed on citizens of Georgia. As of 10 January 2023, Georgian citizens had visa-free or visa on arrival access to 116 countries and territories, ranking the Georgian passport 50th in terms of travel freedom according to the Henley Passport Index.

The President of the European Parliament and Chairman of the EU Council signed a legislative act changing the EC regulation No. 539/2001. Georgia was added to the list of visa free countries Annex II. The change entered into force on 28 March 2017.

Visa requirements map

Visa requirements

Dependent, Disputed, or Restricted territories

Unrecognized or partially recognized countries

Dependent and autonomous territories

See also 

 Visa policy of Georgia
 Georgian passport

References and Notes
References

Notes

Georgia
Foreign relations of Georgia (country)